Jiang Ying (born July 19, 1963) is a Chinese volleyball player who competed in the 1984 Summer Olympics and in the 1988 Summer Olympics.

Career
Jiang won the 1982 World Championship. In 1984, she was a member of the Chinese volleyball team which won the gold medal. She played three matches.

In 1986, she also won the Olympic bronze medal with the Chinese team. She played all five matches. She won the 1986 World Championship.

She moved to Adelaide, South Australia, and is married with two children.

External links
 DatabaseOlympics profile

1963 births
Living people
Chinese women's volleyball players
Olympic bronze medalists for China
Olympic gold medalists for China
Olympic volleyball players of China
Volleyball players at the 1984 Summer Olympics
Volleyball players at the 1988 Summer Olympics
Volleyball players from Shandong
Olympic medalists in volleyball
Asian Games medalists in volleyball
Volleyball players at the 1982 Asian Games
Volleyball players at the 1986 Asian Games
Medalists at the 1982 Asian Games
Medalists at the 1986 Asian Games
Asian Games gold medalists for China
Medalists at the 1988 Summer Olympics
Medalists at the 1984 Summer Olympics
People from Weihai
Chinese emigrants to Australia